Calanca is a municipality in the Moesa Region in the Swiss canton of Graubünden.  On 1 January 2015 the former municipalities of Arvigo, Braggio, Cauco and Selma merged to form the new municipality of Calanca.

History
Arvigo is first mentioned in 1453 as Arvicho.

Braggio is first mentioned in 1419 as Bragio.  It was part of the old municipality of Calanca until 1851 when it became an independent municipality.

The church at Cauco is first mentioned in 1497.  The village was part of the Squadra di Calanca until 1851 when it became an independent municipality.

The village that became Selma was part of the Squadra di Calanca until 1796.  Between 1796 and 1851 it was  part of the Calanca interiore municipality.  It was first called Selma in 1812, but it wasn't until 1851 that it became an independent political municipality.

Geography

Of this area,  or 10.2% was used for agricultural purposes, while  or 57.5% was forested. Of the built up area, housing and buildings made up 0.7% and transportation infrastructure made up 0.7%. Out of the forested land, 48.7% of the total land area is heavily forested and 3.5% is covered with orchards or small clusters of trees. Of the agricultural land, 3.4% is pastures and 6.8% is used for alpine pastures. All the water in the municipality is flowing water. Of the unproductive areas, 12.7% is unproductive vegetation and 16.5% is too rocky for vegetation.

Demographics

Historic population
The historical population is given in the following chart:

Sights

The villages of Landarenca, Braggio and Bodio / Cauco are all part of the Inventory of Swiss Heritage Sites.

Weather
Braggio has an average of 97.4 days of rain per year and on average receives  of precipitation. During this month there is precipitation for an average of 12 days.

Notable people 
 Roger Sablonier (1941–2010), Swiss historian and writer, University of Zürich faculty

References

External links
Arvigo Official Web site
Braggio Official Web site
 Cauco Official website 
 Selma Official website 

 
Municipalities of Graubünden